Trambileno (Trambelém in local dialect) is a comune (municipality) in Trentino in the northern Italian region Trentino-Alto Adige/Südtirol, located about  south of Trento.

Trambileno borders the following municipalities: Rovereto, Terragnolo, Vallarsa, Posina and Valli del Pasubio.

It is known as the location of the Eremo di San Colombano monastery, a  church set on a rock ledge.

Twin towns
 Bento Gonçalves, Brazil, since 2007

References

Cities and towns in Trentino-Alto Adige/Südtirol